The rank of first chief master sergeant in the Armed Forces of the Philippines was passed in a bill filed by Senator Rodolfo Biazon back in July 2004. It is expected that President Gloria Macapagal Arroyo will sign it very soon, enabling the rank to be created.

Rank's Aim
 According to Bill Number 1286, the creation of the first chief master sergeant aims to professionalize the Armed Forces of the Philippines, especially in allowing its soldiers to choose a better career while serving in the army. The ranks are to be considered as non-commissioned officer ranks.

See also
 First master chief petty officer

Sources and notes

External links
 Philippine Senate bill of 13th Congress with explanation

Military ranks of the Philippines